is a Japanese pop music band. D-51 is group consisting of two men, Yu and Yasu. They are signed under Pony Canyon label. According to its members, the name D-51 came from Japanese National Railways' D51 steam locomotive class.

In 2005, they had their first big hit with the single No More Cry, which peaked at no. 5 on Oricon charts and became the 13th best selling single of the year, selling 402,034 copies.

Members
Yu : born Yū Uezato (上里優 Uezato Yū) on November 9, 1983 in Ginowan, Okinawa Prefecture, Japan.
Yasu : born Yasuhide Yoshida (吉田安英 Yoshida Yasuhide) on April 6, 1982 in Naha, Okinawa Prefecture, Japan.

Discography

Singles

Albums

References

 "'Brand New World'". (November 2006) Newtype USA. p. 118.

External links
 D-51 Official Website  
 D-51 Official Blog 

Japanese pop music groups
Pony Canyon artists
Musical groups from Okinawa Prefecture
Japanese boy bands